Seydili can refer to:

 Seydili, Palu
 Seydili, Silifke